Coronel Portillo is the second largest of four provinces in the Ucayali Region in Peru. Its capital is Pucallpa.

Languages
According to the 2007 census, 92.8% of the population spoke Spanish as their first language, while 0.8% spoke Quechua, 0.5% spoke Asháninka, 0.1% spoke Aymara and 5.7% spoke other indigenous languages.

Political division
The province is divided into seven districts (singular: distrito), each of which is headed by a mayor (alcalde). The districts, with their capitals in parenthesis, are:

 Callería (Pucallpa)
 Campoverde (Campoverde)
 Iparía (Iparia)
 Manantay (San Fernando)
 Masisea (Masisea)
 Yarinacocha (Puerto Callao)
 Nueva Requena (Nueva Requena)

Places of interest 
 El Sira Communal Reserve
 Yarinaqucha

Provinces of the Ucayali Region